Snook Middle & High School or Snook Secondary School is a 2A public high school located in Snook, Texas (USA). It is part of the Snook Independent School District located in southeastern Burleson County. In 2011, the school was rated "Improvement Required" by the Texas Education Agency.

Athletics
The Snook Bluejays compete in the following sports:

Baseball
Basketball
Cross Country
Football
Golf
Powerlifting
Softball
Tennis
Track and Field
Volleyball

State Titles
Boys Basketball - 
1965(B), 1966(B), 1969(B), 1978(1A), 1979(B), 1980(B), 1981(1A), 1982(1A), 1983(1A), 1984(1A),
Girls Basketball - 
1986(1A)
Boys Cross Country - 
2000(1A)
Boys Track - 
1979(B),1980(B), 1981(1A), 1982(1A)

State Finalists
Boys Basketball –
1971(B), 1972(B), 1974(1A), 2005(1A/D1)

Notable alumni
Leighton Schubert, state representative for District 13; lawyer in Caldwell, Texas

Bruce Skrabanek, Lieutenant Colonel in the US Army, and Bronze Star recipient. Valedictorian of the class of 1990

References

External links
Snook ISD

Schools in Burleson County, Texas
Public high schools in Texas
Public middle schools in Texas